Bolma kermadecensis is a species of sea snail, a marine gastropod mollusk in the family Turbinidae, the turban snails.

Description
The height of the shell attains 36 mm, its diameter 47 mm.

Distribution
This marine species is endemic to New Zealand and occurs the Kermadec Islands.

References

 Marshall, B.A. 1979: The Trochidae and Turbinidae of the Kermadec Ridge (Mollusca: Gastropoda), New Zealand Journal of Zoology, 6(4)

External links
 To Encyclopedia of Life
 To World Register of Marine Species

kermadecensis
Gastropods of New Zealand
Gastropods described in 1979